Stephen V. Burks is professor of economics and management at the University of Minnesota. He is an expert in the economic history of the trucking industry in the United States and is a former truck driver. Burks is chairperson of the standing technical Committee on Trucking Industry Research at the Transportation Research Board. He received his BA from Reed College, MAs from the University of Massachusetts Amherst and Indiana University, and his PhD from the University of Massachusetts Amherst (1999).

References

External links 
, 

Living people
Year of birth missing (living people)
University of Massachusetts Amherst alumni
Indiana University alumni
Reed College alumni
Transport economists
University of Minnesota faculty
American truck drivers
American economists